Latrophilins are a group of highly conserved G-protein coupled receptors from the adhesion G protein-coupled receptor family. These receptors were originally identified based on their ability to bind to a component of black widow spider venom known as alpha-latrotoxin. This conserved family of membrane proteins has up to three homologues in chordate species, including humans.

The precise functions of latrophilins remain unknown. Genetic defects in latrophilin genes have been associated with diseases such as attention-deficit hyperactivity disorder and cancer.

Human proteins containing this domain 
 Latrophilin 1 (LPHN1)
 Latrophilin 2 (LPHN2)
 Latrophilin 3 (LPHN3)

See also
 ELTD1

References